In classical architecture, an architrave (from  "chief beam", also called an epistyle; from Greek ἐπίστυλον epistylon "door frame") is the lintel or beam that rests on the capitals of columns.

The term can also apply to all sides, including the vertical members, of a frame with mouldings around a door or window. The word "architrave" has come to be used to refer more generally to a style of mouldings (or other elements) framing a door, window or other rectangular opening, where the horizontal "head" casing extends across the tops of the vertical side casings where the elements join (forming a butt joint, as opposed to a miter joint).

Classical architecture 
In an entablature in classical architecture, it is the lowest part, below the frieze and cornice. The word is derived from the Greek and Latin words arche and trabs combined to mean "main beam".  The architrave is different in the different Classical orders. In the Tuscan order, it only consists of a plain face, crowned with a fillet, and is half a module in height. In the Doric and Composite order, it has two faces, or fasciae, and three in the Ionic and Corinthian order, in which it is 10/12 of a module high, though but half a module in the rest.

Metaphorical use 
The term architrave has also been used in academic writing to mean the fundamental part of something (a speech, a thought or a reasoning), or the basis upon which an idea, reasoning, thought or philosophy is built.

Examples:
 "...the Mature Hegel – the Hegel of the Philosophy of Right – who becomes the architrave on which he (Honneth, ed.) constructs his social philosophy."
"to become the architrave of his theoretic construction"

Indian architecture 
In śilpaśāstra, the Hindu texts on architecture, the architrave is commonly referred to by its Sanskrit name uttara. In Hindu temple architecture it is placed above the bracket (potika) of a pillar (stambha), which gives it extra support. The Indian entablature is called prastara.

Dravidian architecture recognizes several distinct types of architraves:

 rounded (vṛttapotika)
 wavy (taraṅgapotika)
 flower shaped (puṣpapotika)
 bevel and tenon type (ādhārapotika)
 voluted (muṣṭibanda)
 figural (citrapotika)

See also 
 Archivolt – expanded and elaborated architrave element
 Dolmen – Neolithic predecessor,  megalithic tombs with structural stone lintels
 Lintel
 Post and lintel – architectural system with architraves-lintels

Footnotes

External links 
 

Columns and entablature
Architectural elements
Ancient Roman architectural elements